Zovik may refer to:
 Zovik, Bosnia and Herzegovina
 Zovik, Iran